Sabine Appelmans  (born 22 April 1972) is a former professional tennis player from Belgium. She was Belgium's Fed Cup captain from 2007 until 2011.

Career
Appelmans started playing at the neighbour's court at the age of seven. Her first trainer, Fred Debruyn, saw immediately that she was very talented. Although right-handed, she played left-handed; at a children's tennis training session she claimed to be left-handed so she could stay with her friend in the left-handed group.

Appelmans turned pro in 1988, and won her first title against Chanda Rubin in Scottsdale in 1991. She made her first Fed Cup appearance in 1988, with a 1–2 loss against Austria. In 1997, she married Serge Haubourdin. Throughout her career, she won seven singles and four doubles titles.

She participated three times in the Olympics (in 1992, 1996 and 2000) - at the 1992 Games in Barcelona she reached the quarterfinals in singles. Her best result in the Grand Slam tournaments is reaching the quarterfinals at the 1997 Australian Open after defeating then world No. 3, Conchita Martínez. Her highest spot on the WTA rankings is the 16th place, which she reached in November 1997. In the doubles she reached, together with Miriam Oremans, the semi-finals of 1997 Wimbledon.

In February 2007, she was appointed captain of Belgium's Fed Cup squad in replacement of Carl Maes, leading the team to a semifinal in 2011. That year, she was replaced herself in October 2011 by Ann Devries.

Awards
Appelmans was elected as the Belgian Sportswoman of the year 1990 & 1991. She was nominated for the Karen Krantzcke Sportsmanship Award in 1994 & 1995.

WTA career finals

Singles: 12 (7 titles, 5 runner-ups)

Doubles: 14 (4 titles, 10 runner-ups)

ITF finals

Singles: 4 (1–3)

Doubles: 2 (1–1)

Singles performance timeline

References

External links
 
 
 
 
 
 
 

1972 births
Living people
Sportspeople from Aalst, Belgium
Belgian female tennis players
Flemish sportspeople
Olympic tennis players of Belgium
Tennis players at the 1992 Summer Olympics
Tennis players at the 1996 Summer Olympics
Tennis players at the 2000 Summer Olympics